Cooper Island is an island in Fiordland, in the southwest of New Zealand's South Island.  It lies within Tamatea / Dusky Sound, east of Long Island.  The island is part of Fiordland National Park and is the third-largest island in the park with no possums present.

See also

 Desert island
 List of islands

References

Uninhabited islands of New Zealand
Islands of Fiordland
Fiordland National Park